Scythris pudorinella is a moth of the family Scythrididae. It was described by Heinrich Benno Möschler in 1866. It is found in Greece, Romania, Russia (southern Ural, Lower Volga region, Altai Mountains), Turkey and Uzbekistan.

References

pudorinella
Moths described in 1866
Moths of Asia
Moths of Europe